"Catch a Wave" is a song written by Brian Wilson and Mike Love for American rock band, The Beach Boys, released on their 1963 album Surfer Girl. In 1990, Wilson wrote of the song: "[It] was more rhythmic.  The guitars were more clean and driving as if to say they didn't wanna stop.  The piano was played by me and it was perfectly synchronized with the guitars.  The 3 different sounds combined to make one unique sound.  I was ecstatic about this."

In 1964, a rewritten version of the song was recorded by Jan and Dean as "Sidewalk Surfin'". It was released as a single and charted at #25 in Billboard.

Recording 
As Al Jardine performs on bass and sings on the track, "Catch a Wave" is an example of the six-man lineup the band had at times in the summer and fall of 1963, prior to Marks' quitting the Beach Boys late in the year.

Personnel
Al Jardine – bass guitar, vocals
Maureen Love – harp
Mike Love – lead vocal
David Marks – rhythm guitar
Brian Wilson – organ, piano, lead vocal
Carl Wilson – lead guitar, vocals
Dennis Wilson – drums, vocals

Variations
The album version was re-released in 1968, but without vocals, for the sing-along Stack-O-Tracks album, which features all-instrumental versions of original Beach Boys recordings.

Even though "Catch a Wave" was never actually released as a single, the track was included on the greatest-hits 1974 Endless Summer album that revived the commercial sales of the band. The selection is also featured in the 1993 box set Good Vibrations: Thirty Years of the Beach Boys, in a version that is approximately 11 seconds longer due to the 'fade' coming after the refrain is sung four times, not twice as is the case with the original releases.

Other recordings
The Kidsongs Kids released their version of "Catch a Wave" on their The Wonderful World of Sports video.

Beach Boys member Al Jardine released a live version of "Catch a Wave" on his Live in Las Vegas album.

The Rock-afire Explosion covered the song on their first showtape.

1963 songs
The Beach Boys songs
Songs written by Brian Wilson
Songs written by Mike Love
Song recordings produced by Brian Wilson